Chrysasura is a genus of moths in the family Erebidae. The genus was erected by George Hampson in 1914.

Species
 Chrysasura flavopunctata
 Chrysasura leopardina
 Chrysasura meeki
 Chrysasura postvitreata

References

External links

Nudariina
Moth genera
Taxa named by George Hampson